The ,  also known as the , was a domain (han) of the Tokugawa Shogunate of Japan during the Edo period from 1601 to 1871. 

The Fukui Domain was based at Fukui Castle in Echizen Province, the core of the modern city of Fukui, located in the Chūbu region of the island of Honshu. The Fukui Domain was founded by Yūki Hideyasu, the son of shōgun Tokugawa Ieyasu, and was ruled for all of its existence by the shinpan daimyō of the Matsudaira clan. The Fukui Domain was assessed under the Kokudaka system and its value peaked at 680,000 koku. The Fukui Domain was dissolved in the abolition of the han system in 1871 after the Meiji Restoration and its territory was absorbed into Fukui Prefecture.

History
In the Sengoku period, the area around Fukui was known as Kita-no-sho, and controlled by Shibata Katsutoyo, the adopted son of Shibata Katsuie, one of Oda Nobunaga's leading generals, after the Asakura clan was dispossessed by Shibata Katsuie. After Shibata Katsutoyo died of illness during the Battle of Shizugatake in 1583, the area was given to the Aoyama clan. However, the Aoyama sided with the Western Army under Ishida Mitsunari during the Battle of Sekigahara and were thus dispossessed by the victorious Tokugawa Ieyasu.  In 1601, Ieyasu awarded Echizen Province to his second son, Yūki Hideyasu as a 670,000 koku fief. Yūki Hideyasu was permitted to change his name to Matsudaira Hideyasu, and he rebuilt Fukui Castle and the surrounding jōkamachi as his capital. His son, Matsudaira Tadanao was of violent disposition and was on bad terms with Shōgun Tokugawa Hidetada, and was consequently dispossessed and banished to Kyushu. He was replaced by his younger brother, Matsudaira Tadamasa, with a reduction in kokudaka to 500,000 koku. His descendants continued to rule over Fukui until the end of the Tokugawa shogunate.

Under Tadamasa's successor, Matsudaira Mitsumichi, the domain was reduced further with the creation of subsidiary domains as Yoshie Domain and Echizen-Maruoka Domain. the domain was plagued with financial difficulties through most of its history, due to frequent flooding, crop failure, epidemics and the profligate spending of its daimyō. In 1661, Fukui became the first han to issue hansatsu (domain paper money).

In 1686, the domain faced a succession crisis and O-Ie Sōdō with the removal of Matsudaira Tsunamasa due to insanity was reduced from 475,000 koku to 250,000 koku. A number of the later daimyō of Fukui were adopted into the clan from the Hitotsubashi-Tokugawa family, one of the Gosankyō, the three lesser branches of the Tokugawa clan. 

During the Bakumatsu period, Matsudaira Yoshinaga (better known as Matsudaira Shungaku), was one of the leading political figures in the final years of the Tokugawa shogunate. The final daimyō of Fukui was Matsudaira Mochiaki, who served as imperial governor under the Meiji government until the abolition of the han system in 1871 and the creation of modern Fukui Prefecture.

List of daimyō

Simplified family tree

Mizuno Tadamasa, Lord of Kariya (1493–1543). Maternal grandfather of Tokugawa Ieyasu. He had issue, including a daughter:
O-dainokata (1528–1602). She married twice and had issue, including three sons:
 Tokugawa Ieyasu, 1st Tokugawa Shōgun (1543–1616; r. 1603–1605) (by O-dainokata's first husband Matsudaira Hirotada (1526–1549))
 I. Yūki (Matsudaira) Hideyasu, 1st Lord of Fukui (cr. 1601) (1574–1607; Lord of Fukui: 1601–1607) (mother: Kotoku-no-Tsubone)
 II. Matsudaira Tadanao, 2nd Lord of Fukui (1595–1650; r. 1607–1623) (mother: Nakagawa no Tsubone)
 III. Matsudaira Tadamasa, 3rd Lord of Fukui (1598–1645; r. 1623–1645) (mother: Nakagawa no Tsubone)
Matsudaira Masakatsu, Lord of Matsuoka (1636–1693)
 VI. Matsudaira Tsunamasa, 6th Lord of Fukui (1661–1699; r. 1676-1686)
 IX. Matsudaira Munemasa, 9th Lord of Fukui (1675–1724; r. 1721–1724)
 VIII. Matsudaira Yoshikuni, 8th Lord of Fukui (1681–1722; r. 1710–1721)
 IV. Matsudaira Mitsumichi, 4th Lord of Fukui (1636–1674; r. 1645–1674)
 V & VII. Matsudaira Masachika (Yoshiyori, as 7th Lord), 5th and 7th Lord of Fukui (1640–1711; 5th Lord of Fukui: 1674–1676; 7th Lord of Fukui: 1686–1710)
Matsudaira Naomasa, Lord of Matsue (1601–1666) (mother: Gesshoōin)
Matsudaira Chikayoshi, 1st Lord of Echizen-Matsudaira (1632–1717)
Matsudaira Chikatoki, 2nd Lord of Echizen-Matsudaira (1659–1702)
Matsudaira Naoyuki, 1st Lord of Itoigawa (1682–1718)
Matsudaira Naomoto, Lord of Himeji (1604–1648) (mother: Shinryō-in)
Matsudaira Naonori, Lord of Shirakawa (1642–1695)
Matsudaira Motochika, Lord of Shirakawa (1682–1721)
 X. Matsudaira Munenori, 10th Lord of Fukui (1715–1749; r. 1724–1749)
Tokugawa Yorinobu, 1st Lord of Kishū (1602–1671) (mother: Kageyama-dono)
Tokugawa Mitsutada, 2nd Lord of Kishū (1627–1705)
 Tokugawa Yoshimune, 5th Lord of Kishū, 8th Tokugawa Shōgun (1684–1751; Lord of Kishū: 1705–1716; Shōgun: 1716–1745) (mother: Oyuri no Kata later Jōenin (1655–1726))
 Tokugawa Munetada, 1st head of the Hitotsubashi-Tokugawa line (1721–1765) (mother: Oume no Kata later Shinshin'in (1700–1721))
 XI. Matsudaira Shigemasa, 11th Lord of Fukui (1743–1758; r. 1749–1758) (mother: Ichijo Akiko later Fushin'in)
 XII. Matsudaira Shigetomi, 12th Lord of Fukui (1748–1809; r. 1758–1799) (mother: Oyuka no Kata)
 XIII. Matsudaira Haruyoshi, 13th Lord of Fukui (1768–1826; r. 1799–1825)
 XIV. Matsudaira Naritsugu, 14th Lord of Fukui (1811–1835; r. 1826–1835)
Tokugawa Harusada, 2nd head of the Hitotsubashi-Tokugawa line (1751–1827) (mother: Oyuka no Kata)
 Tokugawa Ienari, 11th Tokugawa Shōgun (1773–1841; r. 1786–1841)
 XV. Matsudaira Narisawa, 15th Lord of Fukui (1820–1838; r. 1835–1838) (mother: Ohachi no Kata later Honrin'in (?-1850))
Tokugawa Narimasa, 4th head of the Tayasu-Tokugawa line (1779–1848)
 XVI. Matsudaira Yoshinaga, 16th Lord of Fukui (1828–1890; r. 1838–1858)
Tokugawa Yoshiyori, 8th head of the Tayasu-Tokugawa line (1828–1876)
Tokugawa Satotaka, 9th head of the Tayasu-Tokugawa line, 1st Count (1865–1941)
Captain Tokugawa Satonari IJN, 10th head of the Tayasu-Tokugawa line, 2nd Count (1899–1961)
 Matsudaira Munetoshi, 20th family head (b. 1940; 20th family head: 1957–present), m. Matsudaira Tomoko (b. 1944, see below), and has issue, including:
Matsudaira Teruyasu (b. 1965)
 Matsudaira Shizuki (b. 1994)
Matsudaira Yasumoto, 1st Lord of Sekiyado (1552–1603) (by O-dainokata's second husband Hisamatsu Toshikatsu (1526–1587))
Matsudaira Tadayoshi, 2nd Lord of Sekiyado (1582–1624)
Matsudaira Yasunao, Lord of Nagashina (1623–1696)
Matsudaira Sadakazu (1662–1745), m. the daughter of Matsudaira Tadamasa, Lord of Kariya (1610–1673)
Matsudaira Naoyoshi, 2nd Lord of Itoigawa (1701–1739)
Matsudaira Katafusa, 3rd Lord of Itoigawa (1734–1773)
Matsudaira Naotsugu, 4th Lord of Itoigawa (1759–1814)
Matsudaira Naomasu, 5th Lord of Itoigawa (1789–1833)
Matsudaira Naoharu, 6th Lord of Itoigawa (1810–1878)
 XVII. Matsudaira Mochiaki, 17th Lord of Fukui, 7th Lord of Itoigawa, 17th family head, 1st Marquess (1836–1890; Lord of Itoigawa: 1857–1858; Lord of Fukui: 1858–1869; Governor of Fukui: 1869–1871; 17th family head: 1858–1890; Count: 1884; Marquess: 1888)
 Matsudaira Yasutaka, 18th family head and 2nd Marquess (1867–1930; 18th family head and 2nd Marquess: 1890–1930)
 Matsudaira Yasumasa, 19th family head and 3rd Marquess (1893–1957; 19th family head: 1930–1957; 3rd Marquess: 1930–1947)
Matsudaira Yasuchika (1916–1947)
Matsudaira Tomoko (b. 1944), m. Matsudaira Munetoshi, 20th family head (b. 1940)
Hisamatsu Sadakatsu, Lord of Kuwana (1560–1624)
Matsudaira Tadamasa, Lord of Kariya (1610–1673)
A daughter, who married Matsudaira Sadakazu (1662–1745), and had issue – see above.

Holdings at the end of the Edo period
Like most domains in the han system, Fukui Domain consisted of several discontinuous territories calculated to provide the assigned kokudaka, based on periodic cadastral surveys and projected agricultural yields,

Echizen Province 
158 villages in Asuwa District
136 villages in Yoshida District
57 villages in Nanjō District
57 villages in Imadate District
93 villages in Nyū District
 8 villages in Ōno District
168 villages in Sakai District

In addition, Fukui Domain administered the extensive tenryō territories in Echizen Province on behalf of the Tokugawa shogunate, deriving substantial revenue from these holdings, which were not counted as part of its nominal kokudaka.

See also 
 List of Han

References

External links

 "Fukui" at Edo 300  
  越前松平氏 (Echizen Matsudaira) at ReichsArchiv.jp 

Domains of Japan
1871 disestablishments in Japan
States and territories disestablished in 1871
History of Fukui Prefecture
1590s establishments in Japan
Echizen Province
Echizen-Matsudaira clan